Nucularia is a genus of flowering plants belonging to the family Amaranthaceae.

Its native range is Selvagens to Sahara and Sahel.

Species:
 Nucularia perrinii  Batt.

References

Amaranthaceae
Amaranthaceae genera